Arop-Sissano, or Arop, is an Austronesian language of Arop village in West Aitape Rural LLG, coastal Sandaun Province, Papua New Guinea.

References

Schouten languages
Languages of Sandaun Province